There are two townlands with the name Newtown, in the Barony of Clanwilliam in County Tipperary, Ireland. 
Newtown in the civil parish of Clonbeg
Newtown in the civil parish of Solloghodbeg
There are nineteen townlands known as Newtown in the whole of County Tipperary.

References

Townlands of County Tipperary
Clanwilliam, County Tipperary